Douglas Meijer (born 1955) is an American billionaire businessman, co-chairman of the US supermarket chain Meijer. He has a net worth of US$16.6 billion (jointly with his brother), as of January 2022.

Early life
Meijer was born in 1955, the son of Frederik Meijer, and grandson of Hendrik Meijer, who founded the US supermarket chain Meijer in 1934. He has a degree from the University of Michigan.

Career
According to Forbes, Meijer and his brother Hank have a joint net worth of US$16.6 billion, as of January 2022.

Personal life
He lives in Grand Rapids, Michigan. In 2016, he discussed his ongoing struggle with depression that started in 2011, when his father died, he was diagnosed with cancer and divorced, all in the same week.

References

1955 births
Living people
American billionaires
Businesspeople from Grand Rapids, Michigan
Doug
University of Michigan alumni